The 11th Edward Jancarz Memorial was the 2008 version of the Edward Jancarz Memorial. It took place on 21 June in the Stal Gorzów Stadium in Gorzów Wielkopolski, Poland. The Memorial was won by Jason Crump who beat Nicki Pedersen, Krzysztof Kasprzak and Tomasz Gollob in the final.

Heat details 
 21 June 2007 (Saturday)
 Best Time: 61.35 - Nicki Pedersen in Heat 6
 Attendance: ?
 Referee: Leszek Demski

Heat after heat 
 Kasprzak, Crump, Dobrucki, Karlsson
 Holta, Ząbik, Adams, Jaguś
 Ułamek, Hlib, Ruud, Zetterstroem
 Pedersen, Gollob, Baliński, Kołodziej
 Crump, Holta, Kołodziej, Ruud
 Pedersen, Adams, Kasprzak, Hlib
 Gollob, Zetterstroem, Jaguś, Dobrucki
 Baliński, Ułamek, Karlsson, Ząbik
 Crump, Adams, Baliński, Zetterstroem
 Kasprzak, Holta, Gollob, Ułamek
 Pedersen, Dobrucki, Ząbik, Ruud
 Jaguś, Karlsson, Kołodziej, Hlib
 Pedersen, Crump, Jaguś, Ułamek
 Kasprzak, Kołodziej, Zetterstroem, Ząbik
 Baliński, Dobrucki, Szewczykowski, Holta (R1), Hlib (R/-)
 Gollob, Adams, Ruud, Karlsson
 Crump, Gollob, Ząbik, Hlib
 Jaguś, Baliński, Kasprzak, Ruud
 Dobrucki, Adams, Ułamek, Kołodziej
 Pedersen, Karlsson, Holta, Zetterstroem
 The Final (top four riders)
 Crump, Pedersen, Kasprzak, Gollob

See also 
 motorcycle speedway
 2008 in sports

References

External links 
 (Polish) Stal Gorzów Wlkp. official webside

Memorial
2008
Edward J